Telangana Sadhana Samithi, a political party in the Indian state of Andhra Pradesh, working for statehood for the Telangana region.

History
TSS was formed in 2001 when A. Narendra, an MP from the Medak constituency, broke away from Bharatiya Janata Party. Narendra became the founding president of TSS.

In February 2002, TSS won one seat (out of 100) in the Municipal Corporation of Hyderabad elections. It had contested all seats.

Merger with TRS
In 11 August 2002 TSS merged with Telangana Rashtra Samithi. He became a central minister when TRS joined the UPA in the government.

References

Defunct political parties in Andhra Pradesh
2001 establishments in Andhra Pradesh
Political parties established in 2001
Political parties disestablished in 2002
Bharatiya Janata Party breakaway groups